The El Paso Mountains are located in the northern Mojave Desert, in central Southern California in the Western United States.

Geography
The range lies in a southwest-northeasterly direction east of Highway 14, and north of the Rand Mountains and Randsburg Red Rock Road. Red Rock Canyon State Park lies at the western end of the range.

Highway 395 crosses the range near Johannesburg.

Features
The El Paso Mountains Wilderness Area is within the range, managed by the BLM−Bureau of Land Management.  The Last Chance Archaeological District, within the wilderness area, is listed on the National Register of Historic Places listings in Kern County, California.

Vegetation primarily consists of creosote bush (Larrea tridentata) scrub community, with Joshua trees (Yucca brevifolia) on the western side of the range.

The Burro Schmidt Tunnel, a mining ore transport tunnel dug by hand by William "Burro" H. Schmidt between 1906 and 1938, goes through the El Paso Mountains. Its southern portal overlooks the ghost town of Garlock.

Prehistory
The Coso People were early Native American inhabitants of this mountain range. They created extensive carvings in rock within the El Paso and neighboring mountains, and conducted considerable trade with other tribes as distant as the Chumash on the Pacific coast.

See also

References
 Alan P. Garfinkel. 2004. Dating "Classic" Coso Style Sheep Petroglyphs in the Coso Range and El Paso Mountains: Implications for Regional Prehistory, v.2/15/04
 C.Michael Hogan. 2008. Morro Creek, ed. by A. Burnham

Line notes

Mountain ranges of the Mojave Desert
Mountain ranges of Kern County, California
Mountain ranges of Southern California
Bureau of Land Management areas in California